The 2019 NAIA Division I women's basketball tournament was the tournament held by the NAIA to determine the national champion of women's college basketball among its Division I members in the United States and Canada for the 2018–19 basketball season.

With the cancellation of the 2020 tournament due to the COVID-19 pandemic and the NAIA's coincident consolidation of its two divisions, this was the final completed edition of a separate Division I NAIA women's basketball tournament. 

Montana Western defeated Oklahoma City in the championship game, 75–59, to claim the Bulldogs' first NAIA national title.

The tournament was played at the Rimrock Auto Arena at MetraPark in Billings, Montana.

Qualification

The tournament field remained fixed at thirty-two teams. No teams were seeded.

The tournament continued to utilize a simple single-elimination format.

Bracket

See also
2019 NAIA Division I men's basketball tournament
2019 NCAA Division I women's basketball tournament
2019 NCAA Division II women's basketball tournament
2019 NCAA Division III women's basketball tournament
2019 NAIA Division II women's basketball tournament

References

NAIA
NAIA Women's Basketball Championships
2019 in sports in Montana